Murom is a city in Russia.

Murom may also refer to:

 Principality of Murom, a medieval region of Rus'
 Murom, Belgorod Oblast, Russia, a rural locality (selo)
 FC Murom, a football club based in the city
 Murom Railway, a Russian former railway that connected Murom and Kovrov
 Murom (pig), a breed of domestic pig